Renato Corsi (born January 24, 1963 in Manhattan, New York, United States) is a retired American-Argentine footballer. He was the first American to play in the Primera División Argentina.

Corsi rose to fame as part of the Argentinos Juniors team of the early 1980s that won back-to-back championships in the Metropolitano 1984 and the Nacional 1985. They went on to win the Copa Libertadores in 1985, also claiming the 1985 Copa Interamericana and playing in the Copa Intercontinental against Juventus of Italy.

Later in his career, Corsi played for a number of other clubs in Argentina including Instituto de Córdoba, Deportivo Armenio, Club Atlético Atlanta and Deportivo Morón.

In 1994, Corsi returned to his country of birth where he played for Fort Lauderdale Strikers.

After retiring as a footballer, Corsi went on to become a football agent.

Titles

References

1963 births
Living people
People from Manhattan
Argentine footballers
American Professional Soccer League players
American emigrants to Argentina
Association football forwards
Soccer players from New York (state)
Argentinos Juniors footballers
Instituto footballers
Club Atlético Atlanta footballers
Fort Lauderdale Strikers (1988–1994) players
Association football agents
Deportivo Morón footballers
Argentine Primera División players